Dupetit Thouars may refer to:

People
 Louis-Marie Aubert du Petit-Thouars (1758–1831), French botanist, brother of Aristide
 Aristide Aubert du Petit-Thouars (1760–1798), French Navy officer and hero of the Battle of the Nile, brother of Louis-Marie
 Abel Aubert du Petit-Thouars (1793–1864), a French Navy admiral who took possession of Tahiti for France
 Abel-Nicolas Bergasse du Petit-Thouars (1832–1890), French Navy admiral who participated to the Boshin War in Japan

Ships
 , the name of several ships

See also
 Du Petit (disambiguation)
 Thouars (disambiguation)